Randy Holland (born 1951 in Calgary, Alberta) is a Canadian poker player.

Holland has won two World Series of Poker events: razz in 1996 and seven card stud high low in 2000. In addition to his success at the WSOP, he was won other events, including at the Bicycle Casino, Commerce Casino, and Foxwoods casino.

As of 2013, his total live tournament cashes exceed $3,275,000. His 37 cashes as the WSOP account for $604,077 of those winnings.

World Series of Poker bracelets

References

1951 births
People from Calgary
Canadian poker players
Canadian expatriates in the United States
Living people
World Series of Poker bracelet winners
American poker players